Susac may refer to:
 Dr. John Susac (1940-2012), who first described the condition called Susac's syndrome
 Andrew Susac, American professional baseball player
 Daniel Susac, American professional baseball player
 Sušac, an island in the Adriatic Sea near the island of Korčula, in Croatia
 Susac Crni, a native red wine grape in the Kvarner region of Croatia

See also
 Suzak (disambiguation)
 Sussac (Occitan: Suçac), a commune in the Nouvelle-Aquitaine region in west-central France